The growing demand for renewable energy has resulted in global adoption and rapid expansion of wind turbine technology. Wind Turbines are typically designed to reach a 20-year life, however, due to the complex loading and environment in which they operate wind turbines rarely operate to that age without significant repairs and extensive maintenance during that period. In order to improve the management of wind farms there is an increasing move towards preventative maintenance as opposed to scheduled and reactive maintenance to reduce downtime and lost production. This is achieved through the use of prognostic monitoring/management systems.

Typical Wind Turbine architecture consists of a variety of complex systems such as multi stage planetary gear boxes, hydraulic systems and a variety of other electro-mechanical drives. Due to the scale of some mechanical systems and the remoteness of some sites, wind turbine repairs can be prohibitively expensive and difficult to co-ordinate resulting in long periods of downtime and lost production.

As typical wind turbine capacity is expected to reach over 15MW is coming years combined with the inaccessibility of Offshore wind farms, the use prognostic method is expected to become even more prevalent within the industry.

Wind Turbine prognostics is also referred to as Asset Health Management, Condition Monitoring or Condition Management.

History 
Early small-scale wind turbines were relatively simple and typically fitted with minimal instrumentation required to control the turbine. There was little design focus on ensuring long-term operation for the relatively infantile technology. The main faults resulting in turbine downtime are typically drive train or pitch system related.

There has been rapid development of wind turbine technology. As turbines have grown in capacity, complexity and cost, there have been significant improvements in the sophistication of instrumentation installed on wind turbines which has enabled more effective prognostic systems on newer wind turbines. In response, there has been a growing trend of retro-fitting similar systems on existing wind turbines in order to manage aging assets effectively.

Prognostic methods that enable preventative maintenance have been common place in some industries for decades such as Aerospace and other industrial applications. As the cost of repairing wind turbines has increased as designs have grown more complex it is expected that the Wind Turbine industry will adopt a number of prognostic methods and economic models from these industries such a power-by-the-hour approach to ensure availability.

Data Capture
The methods for wind turbine prognostics can broadly be grouped into two categories:

 SCADA based
 Vibration based

Most wind turbines are fitted with a range of instrumentation by the manufacturer. However this is typically limited to parameters required for turbine operation, environmental conditions and drive train temperatures.  This SCADA based turbine prognostics approach is the most economical approach for more rudimentary wind turbine designs.

For more complex designs, with complex drive-train and lubrication systems, a number of studies have demonstrated the value of Vibration monitoring and Oil monitoring prognostic systems. These are now widely commercially available.

Data Analysis 
Once data is collected by on board data acquisition systems, this is typically processed and communicated to ground based or cloud based data storage system.

Raw parameters and derived health indicators are typically trended over time. Due to the nature of drive-train faults, these are typically analysed in the frequency domain in order to diagnose faults.

GHE can be generated from a wind turbine SCADA (Supervisory Control and Data Acquisition) system, by interpreting turbine performance as its capability to generate power under dynamic environmental conditions. Wind speed, wind direction, pitch angle and othera parameters are first selected as input. Then two key parameters in characterizing wind power generation, wind speed and actual power output, collected while turbine is known to work under nominal healthy condition are used to establish a baseline model. When real-time data arrives, same parameters are used to model current performance. GHE is obtained by computing the distance between the new data and its baseline model.

By trending the GHE over time, performance prediction can be made when unit revenue will drop below a predetermined break-even threshold. Maintenance should be triggered and directed to components with low LDE values. LDE is computed based on measurements from condition monitoring system (CMS) and SCADA, and is used to locate and diagnose incipient failure at component level.

Machine learning is also used by collecting and analyzing massive amounts of data such as vibration, temperature, power and others from thousands of wind turbines several times per second to predict and prevent failures.

See also 
 Decision support system
 Prognostics

References 

Wind power